Ricanula is a genus of planthopper belonging to family Ricaniidae.

Species
Species within this genus include:
 Ricanula adjuncta
 Ricanula stigmatica
 Ricanula sublimata

References

Auchenorrhyncha genera
Ricaniidae